Richard Louis Nardi (September 25, 1915 – January 28, 1965) was an American professional football player who played in 14 career games for the Detroit Lions, Brooklyn Dodgers and Pittsburgh Pirates of the National Football League from 1938 to 1939.

References

1915 births
1965 deaths
Players of American football from Ohio
Detroit Lions players
Brooklyn Dodgers (NFL) players
Pittsburgh Pirates (football) players